Chris Harris (born 28 June 1951) is a former Australian politician who served as the first Greens Councillor of the City of Sydney, and for a single term as the Deputy Lord Mayor of Sydney from 2006 to 2007.

Early life and career
Christopher David Harris was born in Wentworthville on 28 June 1951 and schooled at Parramatta Marist High School. He attended the University of New South Wales and graduated with Bachelor of Commerce in the 1970s and a Bachelor of Laws in 2005. He married Kathy in 1972 and together they raised two daughters.

Harris worked in the Commonwealth Bank then moved on to a position in research in the Reserve Bank. After moving into small business, his work focused on campaigns, communications, conflict resolution, and project coordination.

Political career
In 2004, Harris was preselected by his party prior to the March 2004 local government election, and was the first Greens Councillor to be elected to the City of Sydney. He served as Deputy Lord Mayor (2006-2007) and in 2008 was re-elected along with a second Greens Councillor, Irene Doutney. Early in his constituency, he took residence in a Moreton Bay Fig tree as a protest against planned removal.

Harris was an opponent of the Sydney cross-city tunnel which opened in 2005. In March 2007, he was involved in a scuffle with Liberal senator Bill Heffernan while handing out how-to-vote cards for the NSW State Election.

In June 2007, Harris fought against the redevelopment of the Carlton United Brewery site in Chippendale, taking the then Minister for Planning to the Land and Environment Court.  In August 2007, Harris heavily opposed the security measures put in place for the hosting of the Asia-Pacific Economic Cooperation conference. Harris was the unsuccessful Greens candidate in the 2012 Sydney by-election, and retired from council at the September 2012 local government elections.

References

External links
 Official website

1951 births
Living people
Australian Greens politicians
Politicians from Sydney
Sydney City Councillors
Deputy Lord Mayors of Sydney